Dr Daniel Connell (born 1970) is an Australian artist and arts educator. He is known for portraiture and was selected for the Australia Council's Arts Leadership Program in 2020.

Early life 
Connell was born in South Australia. He has a Bachelor of Spanish and Latin American studies and a Diploma of Education from Flinders University, a Master of Visual Art and a PhD from the University of South Australia. He lived in India for two years and travels and exhibits there. He participated in the Kochi-Muziris Biennale and one of his works was vandalised during the first Biennale. Connell exhibited his portraits of Sikhs in London.

Connell lectures at Adelaide Central School of Art.

Artistic style and subject 
Connell is known for his large-scale, drawn portraits of migrants, particularly of the Indian community in South Australia. He created portraits of fishermen and cancer patients in India.

Awards and prizes 
 Finalist, Doug Moran Portrait Prize (2008)
 Finalist, 7th Prospect Portrait Prize (2011)
 Finalist, 9th Prospect Portrait Prize (2107)

Major exhibitions 
 Kochi-Muziris Biennale (2012)
 Kochi-Muziris Biennale (2014) 
 Kochi-Muziris Biennale (2016)

References

External links 
 Video: Daniel Connell Draws Two Portraits at the South Australian Museum
 TedxUbud: How art teaches you to approach the unfamiliar
 Entry in Design & Art Australia Online

Living people
1970 births
Artists from South Australia
Australian contemporary artists
Artists from Adelaide
20th-century Australian artists
21st-century Australian artists
Australian art teachers